Summerville is a borough in Jefferson County, Pennsylvania, United States. The population was 528 at the 2010 census.

History
It was named after Summers Baldwin, the first settler in the area. It was formerly known as "Troy". The borough was incorporated in 1887.

Geography
Pennsylvania Route 28 (Harrison Street) passes through the north side of the borough, leading northeast up the creek valley  to Brookville, the county seat, and southwest  to New Bethlehem.

Demographics

At the 2000 census, there were 525 people, 209 households and 158 families residing in the borough. The racial makeup of the borough was 98.10% White, 0.57% Native American, and 1.33% from two or more races.

There were 209 households, of which 29.2% had children under the age of 18 living with them, 61.2% were married couples living together, 10.0% had a female householder with no husband present, and 24.4% were non-families. 24.4% of all households were made up of individuals, and 13.9% had someone living alone who was 65 years of age or older. The average household size was 2.44 and the average family size was 2.88.

20.0% of the population were under the age of 18, 7.0% from 18 to 24, 30.3% from 25 to 44, 22.1% from 45 to 64, and 20.6% who were 65 years of age or older. The median age was 41 years. For every 100 females there were 92.3 males. For every 100 females age 18 and over, there were 90.9 males.

The median household income was $30,909 and the median family income was $38,000. Males had a median income of $26,792 compared with $18,409 for females. The per capita income was $16,745. About 3.2% of families and 6.1% of the population were below the poverty line, including 7.5% of those under age 18 and 2.7% of those age 65 or over.

Education
Christ's Dominion Academy, a private Christian school, is located in the borough.

References

Populated places established in 1812
Boroughs in Jefferson County, Pennsylvania